Ruz Badan (also Romanized as Rūz Badān, Rūzbedān, and Rūzbodān; also known as Rūzīdān) is a village in Jaydasht Rural District, in the Central District of Firuzabad County, Fars Province, Iran. At the 2006 census, its population was 744, in 153 families.

References 

Populated places in Firuzabad County